Short Brothers Limited was a British shipbuilding company formed in 1850 and based at Pallion, Sunderland since 1869. The company closed in 1964 when it failed to invest to build bigger ships.

19th century
In 1850 George Short founded a shipyard at Hylton to build small wooden ships for local users. In 1860 Short moved the yard downriver to Pallion and his four sons became partners in the business. In 1871 the yard built its first iron-hulled ship the High Stretfield and the company started using the name Short Brothers. John Y Short became a distinguished naval architect and at the 1878 Paris Exhibition he was awarded a gold medal.

In 1883 Short's built a cargo liner for James Knott's Prince Line of Newcastle upon Tyne. This was the beginning of a 35-year relationship in which Short's supplied Prince Line with a total of 37 ships. They included the passenger liner , built in 1897, which spent its early years of service carrying thousands of Italian migrants to the USA.

In 1895 John Y Short made a substantial investment in John Thomas North's Nitrate Producers' Steamship Company Ltd ("Anglo Line").

From 1897 Short's undertook contract work for several Tyneside shipyards. In 1900 John Y Short died, his brother Joseph took over and the business was converted from a partnership into a limited company, Short Brothers Limited. The yard now employed 1,500 people.

20th century
In the First World War the yard built 14 barges for the Admiralty, plus merchant ships including four cargo ships to the War Shipping Controller's standard B type design.

During the 1920s shipbuilding declined. Short's workforce struck in 1923 and 1926 and the yard closed in June 1930.

In 1933 Short's reopened to build , a tramp steamer designed by Joseph Isherwood. She was the first of Isherwood's new "arcform" design, which increased cargo capacity by 10% and increased speed, but also reduced fuel consumption. Arcwear was launched in November 1933 and made her maiden voyage in 1934. Her fuel economy and speed exceeded expectations but she rolled badly in heavy weather and did not even move smoothly in calm weather. Only a few further arcform cargo ships and tankers were built. In 1938 Short's closed again, despite having a tramp ship still under construction.

In the summer of 1939 Short's reopened again. During the Second World War it built mostly tramp steamers, plus two tankers and one LCT. Under the direction of the Ministry of War Transport by the end of 1944 Short's switched from building ships to its own design to assembling partly prefabricated government standard C-type cargo ships. By the end of the war Short's was employing about 900 people.

In 1946 John H Short was company chairman and H.S. Short, great-grandson of the founder, joined the board of directors.

In the early 1960s the Short family did not want to invest in lengthening the yard's berths to build bigger ships. Therefore, after Short's launched the universal bulk carrier  on 17 October 1963 and completed her in January 1964, they closed the business with the loss of 300 jobs.

1889 – SS Magnus Mail – hull 184
1892 – 
1910 – 
1918 – 
1927 –  – hull 425
1940 – 
1941 – 
1941 –  – hull 466
1941 – 
1941 – 
1941 – 
1942 –  – hull 474
1942 – 
1942 – 
1942 – 
1942 – 
1943 – 
1943 – 
1943 – 
1943 – 
1943 –  – hull 480
1944 – 
1945 – 
1945 – 
1945 – 
1946 – 
1952 –

References

External links
 

Defunct shipbuilding companies of the United Kingdom
Shipbuilding companies of the City of Sunderland
British companies established in 1900
Manufacturing companies established in 1900
Manufacturing companies disestablished in 1964
1900 establishments in England
1964 disestablishments in England
British companies disestablished in 1964